Rebel Creek is a stream in the U.S. state of Nevada.

According to tradition, Rebel Creek was named by a Southern sympathizer who won naming rights in a fight against a Northern foe.

References

Rivers of Humboldt County, Nevada
Rivers of Nevada